Albanian partial local elections of 2013 were held on September 1, 2013, and November 3, 2013. Following the Parliamentary Elections in June, and the new Albanian Government composition announced on July 31, 2013, there were reelections in four municipalities, three of them rural.The elections were administrated by the Central Election Commission of Albania.

September 1, 2013
Dardhas Municipality in Korçë District
Turnout: 60,64% (over 50% of which were women).
Results:
Genci Hamollari representing Socialist Movement for Integration, 1138 votes
Gentian Pere representing Democratic Party, 412 votes

Rrethina Municipality in Shkodër District
Turnout: 34% (of which less than 38% were women).
Results:
Luan Harusha representing Socialist Party, 4411 votes
Ridvan Guri representing Democratic Party, 1402 votes

November 3, 2013
Korçë Municipality in Korçë District
Turnout: 30,92% (over 45% of which were women)
Results:
Sotiraq Filo, representing the coalition "Alliance for the European Albania", consisting of Socialist Party of Albania and Socialist Movement for Integration, 15953 votes
Sotiraq Stratobërdha, representing the coalition "Alliance for the Citizenry of Korça", consisting of Democratic Party of Albania and Republican Party of Albania, 5283 votes

Karbunarë Municipality in Lushnje District
Turnout:  51,14% (around 44% of which were women)
Results:
Mynyr Shehu, representing the coalition "Alliance for Karbunare", consisting of Democratic Party of Albania and Republican Party of Albania, 864 votes
Bektash Nezha, representing the coalition "Alliance for the European Albania", consisting of Socialist Party of Albania and Socialist Movement for Integration, 1173 votes

See also
2011 Albanian local elections
2013 Albanian parliamentary election

References

External links
Central Elections Commissions Official Website

2013 elections in Europe
2013
Partial local elections
September 2013 events in Europe
November 2013 events in Europe